"Kamp Krusty" is the first episode of the fourth season of the American animated television series The Simpsons. It originally aired on the Fox network in the United States on September 24, 1992. During summer vacation, the children of Springfield attend Kamp Krusty, a summer camp named after Krusty the Clown. The camp is extremely unpleasant, leading to the campers rebelling against the camp director. Meanwhile, with the kids away, Homer and Marge's relationship improves, with the former losing much of his excess weight.

The episode was written by David M. Stern and directed by Mark Kirkland.

Plot
Bart and Lisa are excited by their upcoming visit to Kamp Krusty, a summer camp run by Krusty the Clown. Homer conditions Bart's visit on getting a C− average on his report card. After getting a D− in each subject from Ms. Krabappel, Bart changes his grades to straight A+s. Homer chides Bart for not faking plausible grades but lets him attend camp anyway, deeming Bart's failure to uphold their deal a miscalculation on his part, and that he did not want Bart hanging around all summer anyway.

The camp's director, Mr. Black, has licensed Krusty's name from the comedian. The campers soon discover Kamp Krusty is a dystopia: the local bullies, Dolph, Jimbo and Kearney, are the camp counselors who take the kids on death marches, feed them nothing but gruel and force them into making knockoff wallets for export, while enjoying deluxe accommodations themselves.

Meanwhile, Homer and Marge enjoy their summer alone. Homer even loses weight and regains some of his lost hair. Lisa describes the camp's brutal conditions in a letter to her parents, but they think she is exaggerating and actually having fun. Bart hopes Krusty will save them, but Krusty is visiting England for the Wimbledon Tennis Tournament and is unaware of the camp's brutal conditions.

To placate the restless campers, Mr. Black informs them Krusty has arrived. He presents a drunken Barney dressed as Krusty, but the ruse does not fool Bart. Bart leads the campers in revolt, driving out Mr. Black and the bullies and changing the camp's name to Camp Bart. During a televised report by Kent Brockman, Bart explains the camp's deplorable conditions sparked the uprising. The stress of seeing Bart as the rebellion's leader causes Homer to instantly lose his regrown hair and regain his lost weight.

Krusty is called away from his vacation to deal with Kamp Krusty's conditions. The campers do not believe he is the real Krusty until a search reveals his distinctive birthmark, pacemaker scar and superfluous third nipple. Krusty apologizes to the kids for their ordeal, explaining Mr. Black and his minions bribed him with a dump truck full of money. As compensation, Krusty takes the campers to "the happiest place on Earth": Tijuana, Mexico.

Production

The idea that the children should go to a camp run by Krusty was first suggested by David M. Stern. The animators were enthusiastic about making this episode because they had all gone to summer camps as children and thought it would be a fun episode to write for. The writers also thought that "it would be fun if while the kids are gone Homer and Marge find that as the kids are miserable their marriage is better than ever." The layout for Bart and Lisa's cabin was influenced by the director, Mark Kirkland, who as a child went to a Boy Scout camp that had exposed wires and other similar faults. Kirkland was also sure that the character Mr. Black would reappear later in the series, but he never did. Al Jean commented, "I guess that the hydrofoil really got Mr. Black out of the show forever."

After he saw the completed episode, James L. Brooks called the writers and suggested that the "Kamp Krusty" script be used as a plotline for a film. However, the episode ran very short, and to make it barely fit the minimum time the Kamp Krusty song had to be lengthened by a number of verses. The episode was also chosen to be the first episode of the season, further complicating matters. As Jean told Brooks, "First of all, if we make it into the movie then we don't have a premiere, and second, if we can't make 18 minutes out of this episode how are we supposed to make 80?"

Along with the following episode "A Streetcar Named Marge", "Kamp Krusty" was a holdover from the previous season's production run. It was the final episode to be produced in this run and so the last animated at Klasky Csupo, before the show's producers Gracie Films moved its domestic production to Film Roman.

Cultural references
Bart’s dream sequence at the beginning of the episode ends with the students destroying Springfield Elementary School to Alice Cooper’s “School’s Out,” mirroring the ending of the 1979 film Rock ‘n’ Roll High School. 

Some elements of the plot are borrowed from the Allan Sherman song "Hello Muddah, Hello Fadduh", a song about a kid who went to camp and hated it. The song was later used in "Marge Be Not Proud", and inspired the title of a later episode. The idea for the song sung by the children was from a 1960s TV show called Camp Runamuck, which has a theme song that is similar to the Kamp Krusty song.

The scene where Lisa gives a bottle of whiskey to a man on horseback (payment for delivering a letter) is a reference to Meryl Streep's scene from the film The French Lieutenant's Woman. Some aspects of the episode are references to the novel Lord of the Flies (a pig's head on a spear, kids using primitive weapons and wearing war paint, and a burning effigy).

The scene where Kearney beats a drum to make the campers work in the sweatshop is taken from the slave galley scene in the 1959 film Ben-Hur. The episode ends with the song "South of the Border". According to the DVD commentary, the song is not sung by Frank Sinatra but by another artist impersonating him. 

When Krusty is confronted by the reporters, he is asked "if him and Princess Di are just friends." A more cryptic reference was made when he is confronted by another reporter and retorts "Where were you when I sang at Farm Aid?" The reference was inspired by Jackie Mason making the remark "Where were you when I marched in the civil rights movement?" Mason had a recurring role in series as Krusty's father.

While the plot of the episode is similar to that of the 1991 video game spin-off from the television series called Bart Simpson's Escape from Camp Deadly, the two are unrelated as the video game was released well before the first airing of the "Kamp Krusty" episode.

Reception
In its original broadcast, "Kamp Krusty" finished 24th in ratings for the week of September 21–27, 1992, with a Nielsen rating of 13.5, equivalent to approximately 12.6 million viewing households. It was the highest-rated show on the Fox network that week.

Nathan Rabin of The A.V. Club gave the episode an A, ultimately saying the episode began the Simpsons''' fourth season in an amazing way.

Warren Martyn and Adrian Wood, the authors of the book I Can't Believe It's a Bigger and Better Updated Unofficial Simpsons Guide, had mixed views about the episode. They said that it is "A bit baffling to non-Americans unfamiliar with the summer camp system. But top grade stuff nonetheless. Anyone who's worked as a counsellor in such a place can testify to this episode's authenticity."

The episode's reference to Ben-Hur was named the 31st greatest film reference in the history of the show by Total Film'''s Nathan Ditum.

References

External links

 

The Simpsons (season 4) episodes
1992 American television episodes
Summer camps in television
Tijuana in fiction
Television episodes set in Mexico